Bajra Shahi Mosque is an 18th-century mosque located in the Bazra Union under Sonaimuri Upazila of Noakhali District, Bangladesh. It has been described as the "most notable historical monument" in the area around Maijdee.

Location

The site is enclosed by an outer wall with an ornate gateway on the east, the whole situated on high ground on the western side of a dighi (reservoir).

History
The mosque was built by Aman Ullah in 1741-42 during the reign of the Mughal emperor Muhammad Shah. Between 1911 and 1928, Bazra zamindars Khan Bahadur Ali Ahmad and Khan Bahadur Mujir Uddin Ahmad had it extensively repaired and decorated with mosaics made from colored shards of ceramic. It is in a fairly good state of preservation, and is on the government Department of Archaeology's list of protected sites.

Architecture

The mosque is rectangular in plan. It has three domes, the middle one larger than those on either side, and octagonal towers at the four corners. The eastern facade has three doorways, the central one larger than the others, each projecting from the facade, opening under a half-domed vault, and flanked by slender minarets. The north and south sides each has a similar doorway.

The interior is divided into three bays by two multi-cusped arches.

See also
 List of mosques in Bangladesh

References

Mosques in Bangladesh
Buildings and structures in Chittagong Division
1742 establishments in India
1740s establishments in British India
Mosques completed in 1742
Sonaimuri Upazila
Noakhali District